Héctor Catalá Laparra (born 17 June 1988) is an PTVI Paraathlete from Spain.

Triathlon 
Catalá started his ITU racing career in 2014, where he had plenty of success due to his strength and determination.

Paralympics 
Catalá competed at the 2020 Summer Paralympics, winning a silver medal in the men's PTVI Triathlon.

References

External links 
 
 https://tokio2020.paralimpicos.es/#/biografia-schedule/1497956|paralimpicos.es - Athlete Profile

1988 births
Living people
Medalists at the 2020 Summer Paralympics
Paralympic silver medalists for Spain
Sportspeople from Valencia